The Pakistani cricket team toured Sri Lanka from 23 February to 27 March 1986. The tour consisted of three Test matches and four One Day Internationals (ODIs). This was Pakistan's first Test series tour in Sri Lanka. The series ended 1–1 with 1 match drawn.

The tour was remembered for the acrimony between to the two sides and poor umpiring throughout the Test series. The latter became the catalyst for Imran Khan to become an advocate for neutral umpires.

Squads

Test series

1st Test

2nd Test

The Sri Lankan second innings is the lowest Test match total to include all four types of extras (no-ball, leg bye, bye and wide).

3rd Test

ODI series

1st ODI

2nd ODI

3rd ODI

4th ODI

References

External links
 Pakistan tour of Sri Lanka 1985/86

1986 in Pakistani cricket
1986 in Sri Lankan cricket
International cricket competitions from 1985–86 to 1988
1985-86
Sri Lankan cricket seasons from 1972–73 to 1999–2000